The EWHL Super Cup is an ice hockey tournament for women's club teams organized by the Hungarian Ice Hockey Federation (HIHF/MJSZ) and the International Ice Hockey Federation (IIHF). It was founded by the IIHF in 2011 in an effort to provided opportunity for clubs to compete and compare themselves against teams from other European leagues.

2022–23 participating teams
 Aisulu Almaty
 Austrian Selects
 Budapest Jégkorong Akadémia
 CHH Txuri Urdin IHT
 ECDC Memmingen
 ERC Ingolstadt
 ESC Planegg
 France Training Center
 Hokiklub Budapest
 MAC Budapest
 Silesian Metropolis Katowice
 HC ŠKP Bratislava
Source:

Champions

References

 
Super Cup
Recurring sporting events established in 2011
Women's ice hockey competitions in Europe
Women's ice hockey tournaments